Cha Yoon-ji (born December 2, 1996), better known by her stage name I, is a South Korean singer and dancer formally under WM Entertainment. She officially debuted on January 12, 2017 with her debut EP, I Dream. She joined The Unit: Idol Rebooting Project in October 2017, but she left the show on November 24 due to health issues.

Personal life
Cha was born in Gwangju and is the younger sister of Baro, a former member of B1A4.

Discography

Extended plays

Singles

Filmography

Television shows

References

1996 births
Living people
South Korean female idols
WM Entertainment artists